Leopard's bane or leopard's-bane may refer to:

Aconitum, also known as aconite, monkshood, wolf's bane, women's bane, Devil's helmet or blue rocket, a genus of flowering plants belonging to the buttercup family
Arnica montana, also known as wolf's bane, mountain tobacco and mountain arnica, a European flowering plant with large yellow capitula
Species of plants in the genus Doronicum (family Asteraceae), including
Doronicum orientale
Doronicum pardalianches
Paris quadrifolia, also known as Herb Paris, True lover's Knot, a species in the family Melanthiaceae